Dreamin' My Dreams is the fourteenth album of original recordings by Patty Loveless.  Released in September 2005, the album debuted on the Billboard Top Country Albums chart on October 1, 2005 at #29 (its peak), staying on the charts for 8 weeks until November 26, 2005.

This was the last album Loveless recorded for Epic Records before the label closed its Nashville division in 2005.

Track listing
"Keep Your Distance" (Richard Thompson) – 3:49
"Old Soul" (Lee Roy Parnell, Tony Arata) – 5:33
"When Being Who You Are Is Not Enough" (Jim Lauderdale, Leslie Satcher) – 3:16
"Nobody Here by That Name" (Arata, Pete Wasner) – 3:56
"Same Kind of Crazy" (Delbert McClinton, Gary Nicholson) – 3:45
"Everything But the Words" (Lauderdale, Satcher) – 4:09
"Dreaming My Dreams with You" (Allen Reynolds) – 4:43
"On the Verge of Tears" (Thom Schuyler) – 3:19
"Never Ending Song of Love" (Delaney Bramlett) – 2:56
duet with Dwight Yoakam
"Big Chance" (Patty Loveless, Emory Gordy, Jr.) – 2:52
"My Old Friend the Blues" (Steve Earle) 2:58
"When I Reach the Place I'm Going" (Gordy, Joe Henry) – 7:45

Personnel
As listed in liner notes.

 Barry Bales – upright bass
 Tom Britt – slide guitar, tremolo guitar
 Kathy Burdick – background vocals
 Burnt Hickory "Ooh Aah" Choir – vocal pads
 Stuart Duncan – fiddle, octave fiddle, mandolin
 Emory Gordy, Jr. – bass guitar, Ernie Ball bass guitar, upright bass, acoustic guitar, fingerstyle guitar
 Owen Hale – drums
Emmylou Harris – background vocals
Tim Hensley – background vocals
Rob Ickes – Dobro, Scheerhorn acoustic slide guitar
Albert Lee – electric guitar
Butch Lee – Telecaster and Owens tenor guitar, Ernie Ball bass guitar, background vocals

 Virgie Lee – background vocals
 Patty Loveless – lead vocals
 Claire Lynch – background vocals
 Ronnie McCoury  – mandolin, Gilchrist mandolin
 Russ Pahl – steel guitar
 Lee Roy Parnell – slide guitar
 Carmella Ramsey – background vocals
 Jon Randall – background vocals, mandolin
 Deanie Richardson – fiddle, mandolin, Owens tenor guitar
 Harry Stinson – background vocals
 Bryan Sutton – acoustic guitar, banjo
 Guthrie Trapp – rhythm electric guitar, sock rhythm guitar (Gibson L7)
 Biff Watson – acoustic guitar

Content 

"Never Ending Song of Love" was recorded a duet with fellow Pikeville, Kentucky native Dwight Yoakam. The original version of “Never Ending Song of Love” was recorded by Delaney and Bonnie Bramlett as a rock/soul song (It was Billboard's #67 top 100  pop single of 1971). It is the second time that they have recorded together. They had previously recorded "Send a Message to My Heart" on Yoakam's album If There Was a Way, released in 1992.

The album's title song was recorded by Loveless in memory of Waylon Jennings.  It was written by record producer-songwriter Allen Reynolds and was originally recorded in 1975 by both Jennings (on his album Dreaming My Dreams) and Crystal Gayle (on her album Somebody Loves You) when Reynolds was Gayle's record producer. The track "When I Reach the Place I'm Going" was originally recorded by Wynonna Judd on her debut album.

Chart performance

References

2005 albums
Epic Records albums
Patty Loveless albums
Albums produced by Emory Gordy Jr.